Hesket Newmarket is a small village in Cumbria, England, historically within Cumberland. It is on the opposite side of  Skiddaw to Keswick within the Lake District National Park.

Economy
Hesket Newmarket was the original base of Carlisle based haulage giant Eddie Stobart Logistics.

The village has two social enterprises, a co-operatively owned pub, the Old Crown Inn and a co-operatively owned brewery, the Hesket Newmarket Brewery.

Etymology
The name is recorded in 1227 as Eskeheued, pointing to Old Norse eski = ash (tree) + Anglo-Saxon hēafod = "ash-head" = "hill with ash trees on", and not the usual origin of placenames Hesket and Hesketh.

Governance
The village is in the parliamentary constituency of Penrith and the Border.

For Local Government purposes the village straddles the Warnell Ward of Allerdale Borough Council and the Skelton Ward of Eden District Council. It also straddles the Thursby and  Greystoke & Hesket Electoral Divisions of Cumbria County Council.

Hesket Newmarket along with neighbouring village Caldbeck, has its own parish council, Caldbeck Parish Council.

Notable people
Eddie Stobart
Edward Stobart
William Stobart

Brewery
The village has its own brewery; Hesket Newmarket Brewery which was founded in 1987, at the back of the Old Crown Inn.  Chris Bonington sent a message from Kathmandu to officially open the pub.

The first beer, Blencathra Bitter, was launched in March 1988, other beers include Doris' 90th Birthday Ale.

Today the brewery is owned by Hesket Newmarket Brewery Co-operative Ltd, which was established to acquire ownership of the brewery. The Prince of Wales visited the pub in 2004 to honour its achievements.

See also

 Listed buildings in Caldbeck
 Stobart Group

References

External links
  Cumbria County History Trust: Caldbeck (nb: provisional research only - see Talk page)
Hesket Newmarket on the BBC

Villages in Cumbria
Caldbeck